André Kerhervé (born 14 August 1911 in Quimperlé) was a French politician, active in Congo-Brazzaville. Kerhervé managed a printing business. Politically, he labelled himself an Independent. He was heading the UDSR in Moyen-Congo. In 1957 he was elected to the Territorial Assembly as an African Socialist Movement (MSA) candidate. On 8 December 1958 he was named Minister of Industrial Production in the government of Fulbert Youlou (along with another socialist member of the assembly, Albert Fourvelle).

References

Republic of the Congo politicians
1911 births
Year of death missing
People from Quimperlé